Bijar Ankish may refer to:
 Bala Bijar Ankish
 Pain Bijar Ankish